KPNY (102.3 FM) is a radio station broadcasting a Religious music format. Licensed to Alliance, Nebraska, United States. The station is owned by My Bridge Radio.

History
The station was assigned the call letters KPNY on August 18, 1982. KPNY was silent from July 7, 2006 to February 5, 2007. In December 2006 KPNY was sold by Halstead Communications to Mission Nebraska (My Bridge Radio), for $360,000.

Construction permit
On December 5, 2012, KPNY filed an application for a U.S. Federal Communications Commission construction permit to move to 102.3 MHz and to a new transmitter site, and increase HAAT to 412 meters. On November 27, 2013, KPNY began transmitting from the upgraded facilities, and was licensed to cover at 102.3 MHz on February 19, 2014.

References

External links
 
FCC application

PNY